The Uganda Davis Cup team represents Uganda in the Davis Cup tennis competition and is governed by the Uganda Tennis Association. Uganda currently competes in the Africa Zone of Group IV. Their best finish is fifth in Group IV in 1998.

History
Uganda competed in its first Davis Cup in 1997.

Current team (2022) 

 Godfrey Darious Ocen (Junior player)
 Edward Birungi
 Joel Mwisukye
 Wakoli Nasawali Ronald (Junior player)

See also
Davis Cup

External links

Davis Cup teams
Davis Cup
Davis Cup